Marshalltown is a city in and the county seat of Marshall County, Iowa, United States, located along the Iowa River. It is the seat and most populous settlement of Marshall County and the 16th largest city in Iowa, with a population of 27,591 at the 2020 census. Marshalltown is home to the Iowa Veterans Home and Marshalltown Community College.

History
Henry Anson was the first European settler in what is now called Marshalltown. In April 1851, Anson found what he described as “the prettiest place in Iowa.” On a high point between the Iowa River and Linn Creek, Anson built a log cabin. A plaque at 112 West Main Street marks the site of the cabin. In 1853 Anson named the town Marshall, after Marshall, Michigan, a former residence of his.

The town became Marshalltown in 1862 because another Marshall already existed in Henry County, Iowa (In 1880, Marshall's name changed to Wayland). With the help of Potawatomi chief Johnny Green, Anson persuaded early settlers to stay in the area. In the mid-1850s, Anson donated land for a county courthouse. Residents donated money for the building's construction. In 1863 the title of county seat transferred from the village of Marietta to Marshalltown. The young town then began growing. By 1900, Marshalltown had 10,000 residents. Many industries began developing in Marshalltown, like Fisher Controls, Lennox International and Marshalltown Company.

Marshalltown plays a small but significant role in the life of Ebe Dolliver, a main character in MacKinlay Kantor's Pulitzer Prize-winning novel "Andersonville" (1955).

Baseball
Adrian Constantine "Cap" Anson, son of Henry and Jennette Anson, was the first European child born in the new pioneer town and is today known as Marshalltown's “first son.” Adrian became a Major League Baseball player and was inducted into the National Baseball Hall of Fame in 1939. He was regarded as one of the greatest players of his era and one of the first superstars of the game.

Baseball steadily became popular as Marshalltown grew in the mid-1800s. Adrian's brother Sturgis also became a talented baseball player and both went to play on intra-school teams at the University of Notre Dame. Both later returned to Marshalltown to play baseball for the town team. Along with their father Henry, the town's founder, they put together a team and became the most prominent team in the state of Iowa. The Marshalltown team, with Henry Anson at third base, Adrian's brother Sturgis in center field, and Adrian at second base, won the Iowa state championship in 1868. In 1870 Marshalltown played an exhibition game with the talented Rockford Forest Citys. Although Marshalltown lost the game, Rockford's management offered contracts to all three of the Ansons. Adrian accepted the contract, which began his professional career in baseball in 1871.

Baseball continued its popularity in Marshalltown. In the early 1880s Billy Sunday played for the town baseball team. In 1882, with Sunday in left field, the Marshalltown team defeated the state champion Des Moines team 13–4. Marshalltown later formed a minor league team naming it after the Anson family, the Marshalltown Ansons. From 1914 to 1928 the team played in the Central Association and Mississippi Valley League.

Natural disasters

Tornado history

On April 23, 1961, the south side of town was hit by an F3 tornado. It damaged numerous structures in the area, causing $1 million (1961 USD) in the town alone. It killed one person and injured 12. Marshalltown would be hit again on July 19, 2018, when another EF3 tornado with peak winds of 144 mph moved directly through downtown at 4:37 p.m. local time. It destroyed the spire from the top of the courthouse, while heavily damaging or destroying several homes, businesses, and historic downtown buildings. Although there were no fatalities, 23 people were injured.

2020 Derecho

On August 10, 2020, Marshalltown was hit by a powerful derecho, which caused extensive damage throughout the city. Over a hundred cars parked near a factory had their windows blown out. Reports described  winds, roofs being ripped off, and loose wood debris embedded in the sides of buildings. One week after the storm, nearly 7,000 residents of the city were still waiting for power restoration; 99 percent restoration was achieved on August 23. The damage to public parks in the city and surrounding Marshall County was "extensive", particularly to trees.

Immigration
Marshalltown's Hispanic population in particular boomed in the 1990s and 2000s with immigrants mostly from Mexico, just like in many other Midwestern towns with meat-packing plants. Another smaller wave of Burmese refugees later arrived in the 2010s.

Federal law enforcement have twice raided the Swift & Company (now JBS) meatpacking plant, first in 1996 and again in 2006, arresting suspected undocumented immigrants for alleged identity theft. One study estimated the 2006 raid caused a 6-month to 1-year economic recession in the area. Explaining the 2006 raid's effect on the community, Police Chief Michael Tupper told The Washington Post in 2018 that “I think that there’s just a lot of fear that it could happen again. It was a very traumatic experience for our community. Not just for the families and people that were directly impacted, but for our school system, for our local economy, for our community as a whole. It was, in many ways, a devastating experience.”

Geography
Neighboring counties include Hardin and Grundy to the north, Tama  to the east, Jasper to the south, and Story to the west.

Climate

According to the Köppen Climate Classification system, Marshalltown has a hot-summer humid continental climate, abbreviated "Dfa" on climate maps.

Demographics

Marshalltown is notably more ethnically diverse than the State of Iowa overall. In 2019, 85% of Iowans were non-Hispanic whites, compared to just 59.8% of Marshalltonians. Most of this discrepancy can be explained by the sizable Hispanic population in Marshalltown (30.7% in 2019).

2010 census
At the 2010 census there were 27,552 people in 10,335 households, including 6,629 families, in the city. The racial makeup of the city was 84.8% White, 2.2% African American, 0.6% Native American, 1.7% Asian, 0.2% Pacific Islander, 7.9% from other races, and 2.6% from two or more races. Hispanic or Latino of any race were 24.1%.

Of the 10,335 households 33.0% had children under the age of 18 living with them, 47.1% were married couples living together, 11.9% had a female householder with no husband present, 5.2% had a male householder with no wife present, and 35.9% were non-families. 29.8% of households were one person and 12.6% were one person aged 65 or older. The average household size was 2.55 and the average family size was 3.18.

The median age was 37.3 years. 26.1% of residents were under the age of 18; 9.2% were between the ages of 18 and 24; 23.1% were from 25 to 44; 24.9% were from 45 to 64; and 16.7% were 65 or older. The gender makeup of the city was 49.8% male and 50.2% female.

2000 census
At the 2000 census there were 26,009 people in 10,175 households, including 6,593 families, in the city. The racial makeup of the city was 86.8% White, 1.3% African American, 0.4% Native American, 1.3% Asian, 8.6% from other races, and 1.8% from two or more races. Hispanic or Latino of any race were 12.6%.

Of the 10,175 households 30.0% had children under the age of 18 living with them, 50.5% were married couples living together, 10.8% had a female householder with no husband present, and 35.2% were non-families. 29.7% of households were one person and 13.5% were one person aged 65 or older. The average household size was 2.44 and the average family size was 3.02.

Age spread: 24.5% under the age of 18, 8.9% from 18 to 24, 26.0% from 25 to 44, 23.0% from 45 to 64, and 17.6% 65 or older. The median age was 38 years. For every 100 females, there were 98.0 males. For every 100 females age 18 and over, there were 95.3 males.

The median household income was $35,688 and the median family income  was $45,315. Males had a median income of $32,800 versus $23,835 for females. The per capita income for the city was $19,113. About 8.8% of families and 12.5% of the population were below the poverty line, including 17.5% of those under age 18 and 10.6% of those age 65 or over.

Economy

Local businesses
 Marshalltown Company, a manufacturer of American tools for many construction and archaeological applications, is based in Marshalltown.
 
 The Big Treehouse, a large tourist attraction located outside of Marshalltown.

Top employers
According to Marshalltown's 2018 Comprehensive Annual Financial Report, the top employers in the city are:

Education
Marshalltown Community School District serves Marshalltown.

The first schoolhouse in Marshalltown was a log cabin built in 1853. The building stood on Main Street between Third and Fourth Streets. Neary Hoxie served as the first teacher.

In 1874, high school classes were held in an old building on North Center Street. The high school had 45 students and C. P. Rogers served as the school's superintendent.

As of 2020, there are multiple schools in Marshalltown. There are six elementary schools, one intermediate school, a Catholic school (PreK–6) and Christian school (1–8), and a middle school (7–8). There is also Marshalltown High School, with over 1,000 students.
East Marshall Community School District serves small portions of the Marshalltown city limits. The district was established on July 1, 1992 by the merger of the LDF and SEMCO school districts. The BCLUW Community School District serves some rural areas nearby Marshalltown.

Infrastructure

Transportation
 U.S. Route 30 bypasses the town to the south, while  Iowa Highway 14 runs through the center of town. An expressway,  Iowa Highway 330 connects Marshalltown to Des Moines.

Marshalltown has bus (Marshalltown Municipal Transit or MMT) and taxicab services. It is also served by Trailways Coach Nationwide.

A municipal airport serves the county, approximately four miles north of town.  The closest commercial airport is Des Moines International Airport,  miles to the southwest.

There currently is no passenger rail service.

Notable people

Cap Anson, Major League Baseball player and manager, Baseball Hall of Fame in 1939
Matthew Bucksbaum, businessman and philanthropist: with brothers Martin and Maurice co-founded General Growth Properties greatly accelerating modern post-war suburbanization
Jerry Burke,  pianist and organist from The Lawrence Welk Show
Blean Calkins, radio sportscaster, president of National Sportscasters & Sportswriters Association 1979-1981
Edwin N. Chapin (1823–1896), postmaster and newspaper publisher
Nettie Sanford Chapin (1830–1901), teacher, historian, author, newspaper publisher, suffragist
Jeff Clement, baseball player for University of Southern California, Pittsburgh Pirates and Minnesota Twins
T. Nelson Downs, stage magician also known as "King of Koins"
Jim Dunn, former owner of MLB's Cleveland Indians
Joseph Carlton Petrone, US Ambassador to the United Nations Office at Geneva
George Gardner Fagg, United States federal appellate judge
Admiral Frank Jack Fletcher (1885–1973), commander during Battle of the Coral Sea and Battle of Midway
Benjamin T. Frederick, U.S. Representative, Marshalltown city councilman
Ben Hanford (1861-1910), two-time Socialist Party candidate for Vice President of the United States
Frank Hawks, record-breaking aviator during 1920s and 1930s
Anna Arnold Hedgeman (1899–1990), African American civil rights leader
Clifford B. Hicks (1920-2010), children's book author
Wally Hilgenberg  (1942–2008), football player
Mary Beth Hurt (1946– ), film, television and stage actress, 3-time Tony Award nominee
Toby Huss (1966– ), actor and voice actor, Adventures of Pete and Pete, National Lampoon's Vegas Vacation, King of the Hill, Halt and Catch Fire
Laurence C. Jones (1884–1975), founder of Piney Woods Country Life School in Mississippi
Lance Corporal Darwin Judge (1956–1975), one of last two soldiers killed in Vietnam War
Noel T. Keen, plant physiologist
Maury Kent (1885-1966), MLB player, Iowa, Iowa State and Northwestern coach
Joseph Kosinski (1974– ), director of Disney film Tron Legacy
Richard W. Lariviere (1950– ), president and CEO of Field Museum of Natural History
Milo Lemert (1890–1918), received Medal of Honor for actions during World War I
Dave Lennox, inventor and businessman, founded Lennox furnace manufacturing business in Marshalltown in 1895
Meridean Maas (1934-2020), nurse, nursing professor at University of Iowa
Vera McCord (1870s-1949), actress and film director, born in Marshalltown
Elizabeth Ruby Miller (1905-1988), state legislator
Merle Miller (1919-1986), novelist, activist
Modern Life is War, hardcore punk band
Allie Morrison (1904–1966), wrestler, world and Olympic champion
Stephen B. Packard (1839–1922), Governor of Louisiana briefly in 1877
Jim Rayburn (1909–1970), founder of Young Life
Adolph Rupp (1901–1977), Hall of Fame college basketball coach, once head coach at Marshalltown High School
Jean Seberg (1938-1979), actress, star of such films as Saint Joan, Breathless, Paint Your Wagon and Airport
Lee Paul Sieg, former president of University of Washington
Jimmy Siemers, (1982-), professional water skier<ref>[http://www.iwsf.com/wrl_1006/ju1006b.txt "2007 World Ranking List, Men’s Jump], List generated on: November 1, 2005 to October 31, 2006,</ref>
 Jeanne Rowe Skinner - American U.S. Navy officer and former First Lady of Guam.(archived)
Wynn Speece (1917–2007), "Neighbor Lady" on WNAX (AM) for 64 years
Billy Sunday (1862–1935), Major League Baseball player and Christian evangelist of early 20th Century
Henry Haven Windsor (1859–1924), author, magazine editor, publisher, founder and first editor of Popular Mechanics''
Michelle Vieth, Mexican-American actress, born in Marshalltown
Peter Zeihan (1973–), geopolitical strategist, author, and speaker

Sister city relations
 Budyonnovsk, Stavropol Krai, Russia.
 Minami-Alps, Yamanashi, Japan

References

External links
 

 
Cities in Iowa
Cities in Marshall County, Iowa
Micropolitan areas of Iowa
County seats in Iowa
Populated places established in 1853
1853 establishments in Iowa